The Baconing is an action role-playing video game developed by Hothead Games. It was published by Valcon Games on the Xbox 360 and independently on all other platforms. It was released August 30, 2011 for PlayStation 3 via the PlayStation Network and August 31, 2011 for Mac OS X and Microsoft Windows via Steam and for the Xbox 360 via Xbox Live Arcade. It is the third game in the DeathSpank series, and follows the character DeathSpank in his quest to defeat the AntiSpank, an evil incarnation of himself.

The game received mixed views from critics. Most critics enjoyed the game's humor, and those who did not noted that players who enjoyed the humor from the previous two games will enjoy The Baconing. Critics were divided as to aspects of gameplay. Some thought that the game had too many repetitive quests, while others felt that gameplay was tightened in comparison to the previous two DeathSpank games.

Premise

The game opens with a bored DeathSpank, the series' protagonist. Having defeated all of his foes in the land, he decides to try on all six mystical Thongs of Virtue at once, and in doing so inadvertently creates an evil incarnation of himself, the AntiSpank. DeathSpank must then travel the land to destroy five of the six Thongs of Virtue in the Fires of Bacon. Once he is successful he can defeat the AntiSpank and bring peace to SpankTopia.

Gameplay

The Baconing borrows much of its gameplay from the two previous titles in the DeathSpank series, DeathSpank, and DeathSpank: Thongs of Virtue. As with the previous games, this title is an action RPG. The game can also be played cooperatively, with the first player controlling DeathSpank and the second having a choice to control one of four sidekicks. Hothead Games addressed a concern from fans about fetch quests, a quest which involves retrieving an object for the person giving the player character the quest. The player can now have the character execute a shield bash to push enemies away. This ability can also be used to reflect incoming arrows back toward enemies.

Development and marketing
The Baconing was announced on May 25, 2011 for the Mac OS X, Microsoft Windows, PlayStation 3. DeathSpank was dropped from the game's title, though it is a continuation of the DeathSpank series. Producer Mike Inglehart stated "This new title isn't DeathSpank 3 or DeathSpank: The Baconing, instead it should be thought of as The Baconing." Inglehart elaborated by saying that "this is a standalone experience that will appeal to fans of the DeathSpank character, but also to gamers everywhere who love unique and engaging video games." Inglehart also clarified that the DeathSpank prefix was not removed due to copyright or trademark issues.

To promote the game Hothead Games ran an Ask DeathSpank questionnaire on game's official website. Fans could submit their questions to be answered by the game's protagonist. It was released on August 30, 2011 on the PlayStation 3 as part of the PSN Play promotion on the PlayStation Network. The Mac OS X, Microsoft Windows and Xbox 360 versions were released on August 31, 2011.

Reception

The Baconing has received mixed reviews from critics.  The game holds a score of 69.10% for the PlayStation 3 version and 64.89% for the Xbox 360 at GameRankings. Metacritic reports a score of 61/100 for the Xbox 360 version and 66/100 on the PlayStation 3. Review scores varied from a 40% approval rating given by Taylor Cocke of Joystiq to an 85% rating from Game Revolution's Nick Tan. The majority of scores fell in the 60—70% range. Year-end 2011 sales exceeded 14,000 units on Xbox Live Arcade.

Several reviewers praised the game's colorful characters, humor and voice acting. Will Herring of GamePro commented in his review that The Baconing has "clever writing and great voice acting throughout". Eurogamer's Christian Donlan called the game's writing "witty stuff" and added that "the script can't wait to shoot off on strange tangents". Tom Mc Shea of GameSpot also praised the game's cast and called them both "oddball" and "amusing". Nick Tan of Game Revolution felt that the dialogue was over-the-top and enjoyable as well.

Critics were divided on the gameplay aspects of The Baconing. Game Revolution's Nick Tan noted that the combat system had been upgraded from the previous two titles, and that the addition of a shield bash mechanic helped when enemies crowded the player character. He also praised the new ability to choose between one of four characters for cooperative gameplay. GamePro's Will Herring, however, felt the gameplay was repetitive and that the fetch quests did not feature enough variety. Though Christian Donlan of Eurogamer had some critical remarks in regards to gameplay he did note that the game is "a fiercely likeable time-waster." IGN's Kristine Steimer recommended that players consider playing DeathSpank: Thongs of Virtue first, as their opinion would be a good judge towards interest in The Baconing.

References

External links

Role-playing video games
Action role-playing video games
Adventure games
Cooperative video games
Electronic Arts games
Fantasy video games
MacOS games
PlayStation Network games
Video games developed in Canada
Video games scored by Jeff Tymoschuk
Windows games
Xbox 360 Live Arcade games
Xbox 360 games
Multiplayer and single-player video games
2011 video games
Valcon Games games
Hothead Games games